Luka Gusić (born 27 September 1989 in Split) is a Croatian football defender who currently plays for Wiener Sport-Club.

Club career
Gusić entered the youth ranks of his local club NK OSK Otok at the age of five, joining the senior team of his low-tier klub at the age of 15. He joined the Druga HNL team NK Junak from nearby Sinj aged 18, making himself a staple in the first team before being snapped up by the Prva HNL team HNK Šibenik at the beginning of 2010. He was loaned next summer to NK Dugopolje, making the deal permanent not long afterwards. His games for the 2011–12 Druga HNL autumn leader drew attention from the Polish Ekstraklasa club Jagiellonia Białystok, and he moved to Poland signing a 3.5 year deal in February 2012.

He has been playing at the 4th and 3rd level of Austrian football since 2014.

References

External links

 

1989 births
Living people
Footballers from Split, Croatia
Association football defenders
Croatian footballers
NK Junak Sinj players
HNK Šibenik players
NK Dugopolje players
Jagiellonia Białystok players
Podbeskidzie Bielsko-Biała players
Wiener Sport-Club players
Croatian Football League players
First Football League (Croatia) players
Ekstraklasa players
Austrian Landesliga players
Austrian Regionalliga players
Croatian expatriate footballers
Expatriate footballers in Poland
Croatian expatriate sportspeople in Poland
Expatriate footballers in Germany
Croatian expatriate sportspeople in Germany
Expatriate footballers in Austria
Croatian expatriate sportspeople in Austria